Panamá is a province of Panama. It is the location of the national capital Panama City, which also serves as the provincial capital. The governor of the province is Judy Meana, appointed by President Laurentino Cortizo and sworn in on 16 April 2020.

Administrative divisions
Panamá Province is now divided into 6 distritos (districts) and subdivided into 55 corregimientos. The five former districts west of the Panama Canal were split off to form Panamá Oeste Province on 1 January 2014.

1 These corregimientos represent as Panama City
2 These corregimientos represent as San Miguelito City

References

 
Provinces of Panama